Metropolitan Dionizy (born Konstanty Nikołajewicz Waledyński 4 May/16 May 1876 in Murom, Vladimir Oblast, Russia - 15 March 1960, Warsaw) was the Metropolitan of Warsaw and all Poland and the primate of the Polish Orthodox Church from 27 February 1923 to 17 April 1948.

Prior he was the Bishop of Kremenets and vicar of the Volyn diocese from 1913 to 1922 and then as Archbishop of Volyn and Kremenets in 1922 to 1923 before being named Metropolitan of Warsaw.

He continued to work for the autocephaly of the Polish Orthodox church, which was finally granted by the Ecumenical Patriarch of Constantinople in his Tomos of 1924. The Russian Orthodox Church at the time did not however recognise the Polish autocephaly.

References

Bishops of the Polish Orthodox Church
1876 births
1960 deaths
People from Murom